Wesley "Wes" Whitead (born April 15, 1933) is a former Democratic member of the Iowa House of Representatives from the 1st District.  He represented the district from 1997 through 2011, with a two-year interruption from 2001 through 2003, when he was defeated by Republican Greg Hoversten.  He did not run for re-election in 2010.

During his last term in the Iowa House, Whitead served on the Environmental Protection, Local Government, Natural Resources, and Public Safety committees, as well as serving as vice-chair of the Veterans Affairs committee.

Electoral history
*incumbent

References

External links 

 
Representative Wes Whitead official Iowa General Assembly site
 

Democratic Party members of the Iowa House of Representatives
Living people
Politicians from Sioux City, Iowa
1933 births